The aestheticization of politics was an idea first coined by Walter Benjamin as being a key ingredient to fascist regimes. Benjamin said that fascism tends towards an aestheticization of politics, in the sense of a spectacle in which it allows the masses to express themselves without seeing their rights recognized, and without affecting the relations of ownership which the proletarian masses aim to eliminate. Benjamin said:

<blockquote>Fascism attempts to organize the newly proletarianized masses without affecting the property structure which the masses strive to eliminate. Fascism sees its salvation in giving these masses not their right, but instead a chance to express themselves. The masses have a right to change property relations; Fascism seeks to give them an expression while preserving property. The logical result of Fascism is the introduction of aesthetics into political life. (...) Mankind, which in Homer’s time was a spectacle for the Olympian gods, has become one for itself. (...) Communism responds by politicizing art.<ref name="Benjamin1935xix">Walter Benjamin (1935) The Work of Art in the Age of Mechanical Reproduction", ch.XIX/Epilogue, link to full translated text </ref></blockquote>

This has also been noted as being connected to the Italian Futurist movement and postulated as its main motivation for getting involved in the fascist regime of Italy.

Alternately, "politicization of aesthetics" (or "politicization of art") has been used as a term for an ideologically opposing synthesis, wherein art is ultimately subordinate to political life and thus a result of it, separate from it, but which is attempted to be incorporated for political use as theory relating to the consequential political nature of art. The historian Emilio Gentile has stressed that these two ideas are not mutually exclusive, and had a large degree of the other.

In Benjamin's original formulation, the politicization of aesthetics was considered the opposite of the aestheticization of politics, the former possibly being indicated as an instrument of "mythologizing" totalitarian Fascist regimes. The politicizing of art", in contrast, requires one to "[affirm] the political value and force of art [by] demystifying concepts like genius and eternal value [and by] demystifying the idea ... that art expresses the essential nature of some nation or race". In other words, to politicize art is to recognize that it is fundamentally a product that exists within a specific socio-cultural context; communism thus "takes art seriously not just as a cultural product but as a cultural force".

Benjamin's concept has been linked to Guy Debord's 1967 book The Society of the Spectacle.

Translations
 by Harry Zohn at marxists.org, published by Schocken/Random House, ed. by Hannah Arendt;
 In Walter Benjamin Illuminations. Some excerpts quoted in 

See also

Aestheticization of violence
Art for art's sake
The arts and politicsThe Work of Art in the Age of Mechanical Reproduction''
 Relations of production

References 

Concepts in aesthetics
Fascism
Political terminology